Hedvig Eleonora Hamilton (9 December 1870 – 11 December 1949) was a Swedish portrait painter working in watercolour and oils.

Life
Hamilton was born in Lund in 1870.

She painted portraits, self portraits, and landscapes with Stockholm motifs in oil and watercolor. She studied further with the artist Richard Burgh in Stockholm under Richard Bergh. She studied further in France and Germany.

Hamilton died in Stockholm in 1949. She was buried locally.

References

1870 births
1949 deaths
19th-century Swedish women artists
20th-century Swedish women artists
Swedish women painters
Swedish painters
People from Lund